Return of the Hero is a 2018 Franco-Belgian comedy film directed by Laurent Tirard and starring Jean Dujardin and Mélanie Laurent.

Plot
In the Burgundy countryside during the Napoleonic Wars, Captain Neuville of the hussars gets engaged to Pauline Beaugrand, whose elder sister Élisabeth has quickly realised that the man is a liar and a fraud. Just before the wedding, Neuville gets orders to rejoin his unit advancing against Austria and rides away, promising to write every day. When no letters arrive, Pauline falls ill with worry and, to cheer her up, Élisabeth starts forging letters. Once the Austrian campaign is over, Élisabeth's letters say he has been posted to India where, as well as fighting the British, he is growing tobacco and raising elephants. Tiring of the subterfuge, Élisabeth writes that he is engaged in what may be his last battle and the letters stop. Pauline marries a shy neighbour, Nicolas, and has two children.

In town one day, Élisabeth is furious to see a stinking vagrant who is Neuville and, when he admits that he is a penniless deserter, gives him money to go away and stay away. In fact he uses the money to get cleaned up and, to her fury, pays a visit to Élisabeth's family. They are overjoyed to find that the gallant captain is still alive and are agog to hear his adventures. He reveals that he now has a diamond mine in India and is prepared to sell shares in the enterprise. Élisabeth is furious that he has taken over the story she invented and is now embellishing it to exploit her neighbours. As well as defrauding the local landowners, Neuville is working his way through their wives and starts an affair with Pauline. Élisabeth is furious and lets Nicolas know. He, being an excellent shot, challenges Neuville to a duel with pistols. When Pauline bursts in on the duel, Nicolas has to take her home, postponing the combat to Neuville's great relief.

An artillery regiment arrives in the area to stop a unit of marauding Cossacks and the general comes to lunch with Élisabeth's parents. Neuville is there and his tales of the war against the Austrians entrance the general, who is called away as the enemy approaches. In fact, the Russian cavalry are lining up to attack the Beaugard's house. Neuville tries to flee but, realising he will not get away alive, faces the charge alone with a rifle, bringing down several opponents. The charge ends abruptly when the artillery find their range and destroy the Russians, leaving Neuville a hero who is reinstated in his regiment. Élisabeth at last agrees to marry him, but the wedding is interrupted when the groom gets orders to rejoin his unit. He rides away, promising to write every day.

Cast 
 Jean Dujardin : Captain Charles-Grégoire Neuville
 Mélanie Laurent : Élisabeth Beaugrand
 Noémie Merlant : Pauline Beaugrand
 Christophe Montenez : Nicolas
 Evelyne Buyle : Madame Beaugrand
 Christian Bujeau : Monsieur Beaugrand
 Féodor Atkine : General Mortier-Duplessis
 Fabienne Galula : Eugénie
 Laurent Bateau : Monsieur Dunoyer
 Jean-Michel Lahmi : Monsieur Loiseau
 Aurélie Boquien : Madame Dunoyer

References

External links 
 

2018 films
2010s French-language films
Films directed by Laurent Tirard
2010s historical comedy films
French historical comedy films
Belgian historical comedy films
2018 comedy films
French-language Belgian films
2010s French films